Quercus boyntonii is a rare North American species of oak in the beech family. At present, it is found only in Alabama, although historical records say that it formerly grew in Texas as well. It is commonly called the Boynton sand post oak or Boynton oak.

Quercus boyntonii is a rare and poorly known species. It is a shrub or small tree, sometimes reach a height of 6 meters (20 feet) but usually smaller. Leaves are dark green, hairless and shiny on the upper surface, covered with many gray hairs on the underside.

References

External links

boyntonii
Flora of Alabama
Endemic flora of the United States
Trees of the Southeastern United States
Plants described in 1901
Endangered flora of the United States
Taxonomy articles created by Polbot